Raffaele Fornari (23 January 1787, in Rome, Italy – 15 June 1854, in Rome) was a Cardinal of the Catholic Church. He was a member of the Papal diplomacy and was nuntius to Belgium in 1842, to France 1842–1851, and prefect of the Congregation for Catholic Education 1851–1854. 

He was named as a cardinal in pectore in 1846 by Pope Pius IX and the nomination was formally published later in 1850.

References

External links 
 Biography at The Cardinals of the Holy Roman Church

Fornari, Raffaele
Fornari, Raffaele
Cardinals created by Pope Pius IX
Clergy from Rome
Fornari, Raffaele
Fornari, Raffaele